Bajaj Group is an Indian multinational conglomerate founded by Jamnalal Bajaj in Mumbai in 1926. The group comprises 40 companies and its flagship company Bajaj Auto is ranked as the world's fourth largest two- and three-wheeler manufacturer. Other notable group companies include Bajaj Consumer Care, Bajaj Finance, Bajaj Finserv, Bajaj Energy, Bajaj Electricals, Bajaj Ventures, Bajaj Hindusthan, Bajaj Healthcare, Bajaj Steel Industries Ltd., Mukand, and Bajaj Holdings & Investment. The group has involvement in various industries that include automobiles (2- and 3-wheelers), home appliances, lighting, iron and steel, insurance, travel and finance.

History 

The Bajaj Group of Companies was founded by Jamanalal Bajaj.

Kamalnayan Bajaj (1915–1972)

Kamalnayan Bajaj, the elder son of Jamanalal Bajaj, after completing his education from University of Cambridge, England to assist his father both in business and in social service. He expanded the business by branching into manufacture of scooter, three-wheeler, cement, alloy casting and electricals. In 1954, Kamalnayan took over active management of the Bajaj Group companies.

Ramkrishna Bajaj (1924–1994)

Ramkrishna Bajaj, the younger son of Jamanalal, took over after the death of his elder brother Kamalnayan Bajaj in 1972. In addition to shouldering business responsibilities, Ramkrishna's energies were largely directed towards the social service and social welfare programmes of the Bajaj Group. He was elected as the Chairman of World Assembly for Youth (India) in 1961. He also held the office of the Managing Trustee of the Indian Youth Centres Trust, which conceived and created the Vishwa Yuvak Kendra in 1968, a youth development organisation.

Rahul Bajaj (1938–2022) 

Rahul Bajaj, the chairman emeritus and former managing director (until 2005) of the Bajaj group was the grandson of Jamnalal Bajaj. He completed his schooling from Cathedral, a school in Bombay. Then he pursued his studies from St Stephen's College, Delhi, Government Law College, Mumbai and Harvard University, USA. He took over control of the Bajaj Group in 1965 and established one of India's largest conglomerates. The President of India, presented CII President's Award for Lifetime Achievement to Mr. Rahul Bajaj on 27 April 2017.

Other notable members 
Some of the other notable members of this family include:
Anant Bajaj: MD, Bajaj Electricals Ltd.
Shekhar Bajaj: Chairman, Bajaj Electricals Ltd.

Bajaj Group companies
Bachhraj and Company Pvt. Ltd. – Investment company.
Bachhraj Factories Pvt. Ltd. – Ginning and pressing of cotton bales.
Bajaj Steel Industries Ltd.
Bajaj Auto – Manufacturers of scooters, motorcycles and three-wheeler vehicles and spare parts.
Bajaj Auto Holdings Ltd. – Investment Company.
Bajaj Auto International Holdings BV – Bajaj Auto venture in Netherlands.
PT Bajaj Auto Indonesia (PTBAI)  - Bajaj Auto venture in Indonesia.
Maharashtra Scooters Ltd. - Manufacturers of Scooters.
Bajaj Electricals - Manufacturers of electric fans, highmasts, lattice closed towers and poles.
Bajaj Finserv – Financial Services.
 Bajaj Finance – Deals in financial services including hire purchase, financing and leasing.
 Bajaj Financial Services
 Bajaj Housing Finance
 Bajaj Allianz General Insurance  – General insurance business.
 Bajaj Allianz Life Insurance  – Life insurance business.
Bajaj Holdings & Investment Ltd. – Investment company focusing on new business opportunities.
Jamnalal Sons Pvt. Ltd. – Investment and finance company.
Bajaj Ventures Ltd. – involved in manufacturing and trading of power tools and manufacturing of houseware and parts.
The Hindusthan Housing Co. Ltd. – Services company.
Hercules Hoists Ltd. – Manufactures 'INDEF' brand materials handling equipment such as triple spur gear chain pulley blocks, chain electric hoists and wire rope.
Hind Musafir Agency Ltd. – Travel agency.
Hind Lamps Ltd. – Manufactures GLS, fluorescent, miniature lamps and major components.
Bajaj International Pvt. Ltd. – Export electric fans, GLS lamps, fluorescent tubes, light fittings, etc.
Kamalnayan Investments & Trading Pvt. Ltd.
Madhur Securities Pvt. Ltd.
Mukand Ltd. – Manufacturers of stainless, alloy and special steels including carbon and alloy steels.
Mukand Engineers Ltd. – Construction, fabrication and erection of industrial and infrastructural projects and infotech business.
Mukand International Ltd. – Trading in metals, steel and ferro alloys.
Hospet Steels Ltd. – Steel plant consisting of Iron Making Division, Steel Making Division and Rolling Mill Division.
Niraj Holdings Pvt. Ltd.
Rahul Securities Pvt. Ltd.
Rupa Equities Pvt. Ltd.
Sanraj Nayan Investments Pvt. Ltd.
Shekhar Holdings Pvt. Ltd.
Baroda Industries Pvt. Ltd. – Investment company.
Jeewan Ltd. – Investment company.

Education
Shiksha Mandal Wardha was established in 1914 by Jamnalal Bajaj for educating the youth of India. This Mandal was a part of the national movement and received support from several national leaders including Mohandas Karamchand Gandhi. It was also the first institute in India to prepare text books and conduct examinations in Hindi and Marathi at the graduate level. Currently, the Mandal runs two commerce colleges (in Wardha and Nagpur), a Science College and Agricultural College and Rural Institute and a Polytechnic at Wardha and in 2017 started its first engineering institution Bajaj institute of technology, Wardha (http://bit.shikshamandal.org/). It has almost 10,000 students on its rolls. Its Science College has been adjudged as a College with Potential for Excellence by the UGC. Its Agriculture College has been rated as 'A' by its affiliating university and its Polytechnic has been rated as excellent by MSBTE.

Kamalnayan Bajaj School location at Chinchwad was established in 1976. Initially, it started off as a school providing education from Lower KG to grade 12 and in 2007 it also started running a junior college.

Dnyaneshwar Vidyapeeth was supported by Madhur Bajaj, Vice-Chairman, Bajaj Auto Ltd for its autonomous engineering school which offers a variety of engineering professional courses.
 
Janaki Devi Bajaj Institute of Management Studies was established in August 1997. It is a Centre of Management Studies and the Postgraduate Department of Management Education of the SNDT Women's University. It offers a variety of full-time and part-time professional courses at Masters level and postgraduate diploma courses in management specifically for women.

Jamnalal Bajaj Institute of Management Studies, set up by the University of Mumbai in collaboration with the Graduate School of Business, Stanford University. With a donation from the Jamnalal Bajaj Seva Trust, was established in 1965. It was the first to start a full-time 2-year Masters Programme in Management Studies (MMS) in India. .

Bajaj Group volunteered to adopt 3 Industrial training institutes for Upgradation – ITI Mulshi, ITI Haveli and ITI Ramnager. A two-day training program was organised for all the staff of the Institutes, at a remote location

The company enabled education of eligible bright backward students with the launch of a program that would help scheduled castes and scheduled tribes students achieve academic excellence and make them at par with those who can afford coaching for top institutes.

Health
Kamalnayan Bajaj Hospital in Aurangabad was established in 1990 as a hospital and research center. Although it was relatively small when it started, it has soon grown into a very well equipped hospital with 225 beds, 60 full-time doctors and 150 staff, organ transplant center, well-equipped Cath Lab, CT Scan, MRI, Mammography & Dept. of radiation oncology and so on.

The Bajaj-YCM Hospital A.R.T Center for HIV/Aids in Pimpri was established as a Public-Private Partnership between Government of India – Ministry of Health and Family Welfare – National AIDS Control Organisation (NACO) and Confederation of Indian Industry (CII) to provide healthcare facilities to Aids patients.

Women empowerment
The objective of the Jankidevi Bajaj Gram Vikas Sanstha is to empower women and it has been doing so by training women in using improved technology for storage of food grains and initiating goat rearing projects owned and managed by women, emphasising the importance of family planning particularly tubectomy operations and securing loans for women members for both consumption and income generation.

IMC Ladies' Wing Jankidevi Bajaj Puraskar for Rural Entrepreneurship, which commemorates the birth centenary of the late Smt. Jankidevi Bajaj, is an award conferred for outstanding contribution of women working for rural development

Self-reliance
The Jamnalal Bajaj Seva Trust initially assisted Sarvodaya workers and Gandhian constructive programmes. It later established the International Sarvodaya Centre in Vishwaneedam to promote agriculture, dairy development, rural development and training local women and youth for self-employment. It also funded the Jamnalar Bajaj Institute of Management Studies and undertook the maintenance of Bajajwadi at Wardha. It also has supported the Kamalnayan Bajaj Hall and Art Gallery.

The Jankidevi Bajaj Gram Vikas Sanstha and it helps the rural population develop self-reliance to do so by building family-size biogas plants, training women in using improved technology for storage of food grains and so on.

The IMC Ramkrishna Bajaj National Quality Awards were instituted in 1997 to encourage Indian Industry to be alert to the importance of quality in the context of global competitiveness. The Quality Award is presented every year to companies in manufacturing, service sector and small business company.

The Institute of Gandhian Studies, established in 1987, promotes long-term and short-term study courses on Gandhian thoughts and methodology. It organises seminars, consultative meets for Panchayat workers, special courses for women members of the Panchayats and trade union workers.

Rural development
The trusts that work towards rural development include Jankidevi Bajaj Gram Vikas Sanstha, Jamnalal Bajaj Foundation, Jamnalal Kaniram Bajaj Trust and Jamnalal Bajaj Seva Trust. The welfare activities are carried out in collaboration with CAPART, Khadi and Village Industries Commission, NEDA, respective State Governments and beneficiaries. They are aimed at improving the living conditions of the rural population via income generation, training for self-employment, improved health and sanitation, supply of drinking water, improved agricultural and land maintenance practices such as horticulture, social forestry and reclamation of waste land. Other activities include distribution of solar-lantern and solar cookers, installation of biogas plants, deepening and widening of wells and drinking water scheme, tree plantation and kitchen gardens, lift irrigation, veterinary services like insemination, vaccination and distribution of cattle feed, watershed development and building of model villages, distribution of agricultural equipment and building a center of Child Labor Welfare.

In addition, the Bajaj Group has also undertaken several educational activities. They not only focus on mainstream education through the maintenance and running of Bal Sanskar Kendras, Balwadis and conducting study tours, but also on vocational education through tailoring classes, literacy and hobby classes, training programmes for self-employment, and so on. Jamnalal Bajaj Award was established in 1978 by the Jamnalal Bajaj Foundation.

Environment & natural resources
The Jankidevi Bajaj Gram Vikas Sanstha has engaged in water conservation projects for improving agricultural productivity, helping build family-size biogas plants, conducting vermiculture projects, and so on.

Standing on the 12th position, it is one of the few Indian brands with an 'international' distinction, and that of being the largest producer of scooters in the world. In the Brand Trust Report 2012, Bajaj was ranked 7th Most Trusted brand in India and in Brand Trust Report 2013 Bajaj slipped one place to the 8th position among India's Most Trusted brands.

In 2014, Bajaj was ranked 46th among India's most trusted brands by the Brand Trust Report 2014. The Report also listed Bajaj Pulsar, Bajaj Allianz, Bajaj Electricals and Bajaj Almond Oil among India's most trusted brands.

References

External links

 
 Bajaj Group – Fortune India

 
Companies based in Mumbai
Conglomerate companies established in 1926
Indian companies established in 1926